Familias frente al fuego (abbreviated as FFF) is a Mexican cooking reality competition television series based on the Australian television series, Family Food Fight. The series is produced by Televisa in collaboration with Endemol Shine Boomdog. It premiered on Las Estrellas on July 14, 2019, and consisted of 6 episodes.

Format 
Eight families, from different parts of Mexico, will face off week by week to win the grand prize of 1.5 million pesos. To be successful, participants must pass the challenges that the judges will evaluate in each episode. The judges, with different specialties, are in charge, week by week, of trying to find the family that cooks the best. The eight teams will be eliminated one by one until one family earns the winner title.

Contestants

Elimination chart

Episodes

Ratings 
The show initially aired at 8:30pm CT. After three episodes with low ratings, Televisa moved the show to 7pm CT, beginning 4 August 2019.

   
}}

References

External links 
 

2019 Mexican television series debuts
2019 Mexican television series endings
Las Estrellas original programming
Mexican reality television series
Spanish-language television shows
2010s Mexican television series
Television series by Endemol